The discography of Unkle, a British electronic group, consists of five studio albums, two compilation albums, two live albums, two remix albums, five mix albums, two mixtapes, eight extended plays (EPs), sixteen singles, twelve promotional singles and fifteen music videos.

Albums

Studio albums

 I Where Did the Night Fall was re-issued in 2011 under the title Where Did the Night Fall: Another Night Out. The re-issue peaked at number 141 on the UK Albums Chart.

Compilation albums

Remix albums

Mix albums

 II For the releases of Do Androids Dream of Essential Beats? and Where the Wild Things Are, Unkle were credited as "UNKLE Soundsystem".

Mixtapes

Extended plays

Singles

Promotional singles

Other album appearances

Guest appearances

Remixes for other artists

Music videos

References

External links
 Official website
 
 
 

Discographies of British artists
Electronic music discographies